The 1948 U.S. Women's Open was the third U.S. Women's Open, held August 12–15 at Atlantic City Country Club in Northfield, New Jersey.

Babe Zaharias won the first of her three U.S. Women's Open titles, eight strokes ahead of runner-up Betty Hicks. It was the fifth of ten major championships for Zaharias.

The U.S. Women's Open returned to the course in 1965 and 1975.

Past champions in the field

Final leaderboard
Sunday, August 15, 1948

Source:

References

External links
USGA final leaderboard
Gettysburg Times explaining par source
U.S. Women's Open Golf Championship
U.S. Women's Open – past champions – 1948

U.S. Women's Open
Golf in New Jersey
Sports competitions in New Jersey
U.S. Women's Open
U.S. Women's Open
U.S. Women's Open
U.S. Women's Open
Women's sports in New Jersey